Oakengates Athletic Football Club was a football club based in Oakengates, Shropshire.

History
Earliest records of Oakengates Town are from as early as 1886–87 when they lifted the Shropshire Junior Cup. In 1923–24 they entered the Birmingham and District League. A cup win was soon to follow in the 1926–27 season when they lifted the Shropshire Senior Cup. The reserves were also successful in these times with a win in the Junior Cup in 1928–29. The first team won the Birmingham Senior Cup in 1929–30 beating Kidderminster Harriers 3–1 and nearly won the Birmingham and District League in 1930–31 only to lose the title on goal difference. They went on to lift the Shropshire Senior Cup again in season 1930–31 and retained it in 1931–32. 

Oakengates won the Commander Ethelston Cup in season 1978–79, a feat which they repeated in the 1988–89 season. They won a Shropshire County League and cup double in the 1978–79 season and retained the cup in the 1979–80 season. A sole County Cup win was achieved in 1992–93. In the 1995–96 season Oakengates Town won a Shropshire County League and Cup double again. 

At the start of the 2005–06 season the club was in serious debt, the clubhouse was derelict through vandalism and neglect and Oakengates Town was near extinction. A few locals decided to retain the history of the club and save it. The club was renamed Oakengates Athletic and moved away from its old ground in Oakengates (School Grove) to a new ground at Hadley via a short stay at Oakengates Athletic Stadium.

The club were champions of the Shropshire Premier League in 2013-2014, 2016–17 and 2017–18. In the summer of 2018 they merged into Wellington Amateurs.

Managers

Honours
Shropshire Premier League
Champions 2013–14, 2016–17, 2017–18
Shropshire County League
Premier Division champions 1978–79, 1995–96, 2016-18, 2017-18
Premier Division Cup winners 1978–79, 1979–80, 1995–96, 2017-18
Commander Ethelston Cup winners 1977–78, 1988–89
Shropshire Senior Cup
Winners 1926–27, 1930–31, 1931–32
Birmingham Senior Cup
Winners 1929–30
Shropshire County Cup
Winners 1992–93, 2016-17, 2017-18
Shropshire Junior Cup
Winners 1886–87, 2011–12

References

External links
Official website

Defunct football clubs in England
Association football clubs established in 1886
1886 establishments in England
West Midlands (Regional) League
Sport in Telford
Mercian Regional Football League
Shropshire County Premier Football League
Association football clubs disestablished in 2018
2018 disestablishments in England
Defunct football clubs in Shropshire